François Gonnessiat (May 22, 1856 (Nurieux-Volognat)–October 18, 1934) was a French astronomer, observer of comets and discoverer of two minor planets.

He worked at the Observatory of Lyon. In 1889 he won the Lalande Prize for astronomy from the French Academy of Sciences; 1901 became director of the Quito (Ecuador) Observatory for the purpose of making geodetic measurements. He became a well known and respected member of the academic scene of the city, where a street is named after him. From 1908 to 1931, he was director of the Algiers Observatory where one of his colleagues was Benjamin Jekhovsky. He was also director of the Quito Astronomical Observatory.

The asteroid 1177 Gonnessia was named in his memory.

Obituary 
 The obituary notice incorrectly states that he was director of the Algiers Observatory only until 1916, rather than 1931.

References 
 

20th-century French astronomers

1856 births
1934 deaths
Discoverers of asteroids
19th-century French astronomers
Recipients of the Lalande Prize